Quentin Earl Darrington (born July 9, 1977) is an American actor and singer known for his work in theatre. He has performed in Broadway productions and national tours of shows including Once on This Island, Cats, and Memphis. He originated the role of Joe Jackson / Rob in MJ the Musical on Broadway, receiving a nomination for the Outer Critics Circle Award for Outstanding Featured Actor in a Musical.

Theatre credits

References

External sites 

 
 

Living people
21st-century American male actors
21st-century American singers
American male stage actors
Place of birth missing (living people)
1977 births
21st-century American male singers
University of South Florida alumni